The 1997 NAPA 500 was the 32nd and final stock car race of the 1997 NASCAR Winston Cup Series and the 38th iteration of the event. The race was held on Sunday, November 16, 1997, in Hampton, Georgia at Atlanta Motor Speedway, a  permanent asphalt quad-oval intermediate speedway. The race took the scheduled 325 laps to complete. At race's end, Joe Gibbs Racing driver Bobby Labonte would manage to dominate a majority of the race to take his fifth career NASCAR Winston Cup Series victory and his only victory of the season. To fill out the top three, Robert Yates Racing driver Dale Jarrett and Roush Racing driver Mark Martin would finish second and third, respectively.

Needing an 18th-place finish or higher in the race, Hendrick Motorsports driver Jeff Gordon would manage to lock up the championship after staying consistently within the top 18, eventually securing a 17th-place finish to win his second career NASCAR Winston Cup Series championship, finishing 14 points ahead of runner-up Dale Jarrett.

Background 

Atlanta Motor Speedway (formerly Atlanta International Raceway) is a 1.54-mile race track in Hampton, Georgia, United States, 20 miles (32 km) south of Atlanta. It has annually hosted NASCAR Winston Cup Series stock car races since its inauguration in 1960.

The venue was bought by Speedway Motorsports in 1990. In 1994, 46 condominiums were built over the northeastern side of the track. In 1997, to standardize the track with Speedway Motorsports' other two intermediate ovals, the entire track was almost completely rebuilt. The project made the track one of the fastest on the NASCAR circuit.

Entry list 

 (R) - denotes rookie driver.

Qualifying 
Qualifying was schedule to be split into two rounds. If the events had run as scheduled, the first round was scheduled to be held on Friday, November 14, at 3:00 PM EST. Each driver would have one lap to set a time. During the first round, the top 25 drivers in the round would be guaranteed a starting spot in the race. If a driver was not able to guarantee a spot in the first round, they had the option to scrub their time from the first round and try and run a faster lap time in a second round qualifying run, which was scheduled to be held on Saturday, November 15, at 11:00 AM EST. As with the first round, each driver would have one lap to set a time. Positions 26-38 would be decided on time, and depending on who needed it, the 39th thru either the 42nd, 43rd, or 44th position would be based on provisionals. Four spots are awarded by the use of provisionals based on owner's points. The fifth is awarded to a past champion who has not otherwise qualified for the race. If no past champion needs the provisional, the field would be limited to 42 cars. If a champion needed it, the field would expand to 43 cars. If the race was a companion race with the NASCAR Winston West Series, four spots would be determined by NASCAR Winston Cup Series provisionals, while the final two spots would be given to teams in the Winston West Series, leaving the field at 44 cars.

The first round of qualifying was postponed until Saturday, November 15 due to rain. This would leave only one round of qualifying ran, cancelling the second round.

Seven drivers would fail to qualify: Todd Bodine, Robert Pressley, David Green, Hut Stricklin, Greg Sacks, Ed Berrier, and Dave Marcis.

Full qualifying results 

*Time not available.

Race results

References 

1997 NASCAR Winston Cup Series
NASCAR races at Atlanta Motor Speedway
November 1997 sports events in the United States
1997 in sports in Georgia (U.S. state)